B.Aralikatti is a village in Dharwad district of Karnataka, India.

Demographics
As of the 2011 Census of India there were 857 households in B.Aralikatti and a total population of 4,357 consisting of 2,254 males and 2,103 females. There were 505 children ages 0-6.

References

Villages in Dharwad district